Pasquale Busca (born 16 October 1948) is an Italian former racewalker.

Biography
He competed in the 1968 Summer Olympics in the 20 km event, placing 12th with a time of 1:37:32. He has 19 caps in national team from 1967 to 1973.

National titles
Pasquale Busca has won one time the individual national championship.
1 win in 20 km race walk (1971)

References

External links
 

1948 births
Living people
Sportspeople from Chieti
Italian male racewalkers
Olympic athletes of Italy
Athletes (track and field) at the 1968 Summer Olympics
Mediterranean Games gold medalists for Italy
Athletes (track and field) at the 1971 Mediterranean Games
Mediterranean Games medalists in athletics
20th-century Italian people